Durga Krishna (born 25 October 1996) is an Indian actress who works in Malayalam films.

Career 
Krishna made her debut in 2017 as Janaki in Pradeep M. Nair's Vimaanam. Her other major roles include Anjaly Junior in Kuttymama (2019) and Sherin in Confessions of a Cuckoo (2021).

Personal life 
She is from Kozhikode in Kerala, India. On 5 April 2021, Krishna married Arjun Ravindran, her producer and co-star from the film Confessions of a Cuckoo.

Filmography

References

External links

Living people
Indian film actresses
Actresses in Malayalam cinema
Actresses in Tamil cinema
20th-century Indian actresses
21st-century Indian actresses
People from Kerala
1996 births